"Cross My Heart" is a song recorded by Canadian pop rock band Marianas Trench. It was released on November 24, 2008 as the lead single from their second studio album Masterpiece Theatre. It was the "Best Comeback" on the January 31 issue on the Canadian Hot 100 and earned the "Sales Gainer" on the February 14 issue on the Canadian Hot 100. An acoustic version of the song was released on March 10, 2009.

Composition
Lead singer Josh Ramsay wrote the song and Dave Genn handled the production of the song. The song runs at 164 BPM and is in the key of D major.

Awards and nominations

Music video
The music video was released in December 2008 and was directed by Colin Minihan. It reached within the top 3 on the MuchMusic charts.

Shot in Vancouver, Canada, the music video starts off with Josh Ramsay singing to a woman that he is following throughout the course of the video. While going down the street, a parade with the rest of the band playing on a float is seen throughout the video. In the end, the woman being followed takes out her headphones, and hears Josh singing to her. She turns around and sees the crowd cheering and applauding to her. She invites him in, the song ends and the crowd stops cheering.

Track listing
Digital download
"Cross My Heart" – 3:12

Acoustic version
"Cross My Heart (Acoustic Version)" – 3:27

Charts

Weekly charts

Year-end charts

Certifications

References

2009 songs
Songs written by Josh Ramsay